"Tears in Heaven" is a song by English guitarist, singer, and songwriter Eric Clapton and Will Jennings, written about the death of Clapton's four-year-old son, Conor. It appeared  on the 1991 Rush film soundtrack. In January 1992, Clapton performed the song in front of an audience at Bray Studios, Berkshire, England for MTV Unplugged, with the recording appearing on his Unplugged album.

The song was Clapton's best-selling single in the United States and reached number two on the Billboard Hot 100. In the United Kingdom, where Clapton is from, it reached number five on the UK Singles Chart, and also charted in the top 10 in more than twenty nations around the world. It won three Grammy Awards for Best Male Pop Vocal Performance, Song of the Year, and Record of the Year. In 2004, Rolling Stone ranked "Tears in Heaven" 362nd on its list of "The 500 Greatest Songs of All Time".

Writing
On 20 March 1991, Clapton's 4-year-old son Conor died after falling from the 53rd-floor window of a New York City apartment belonging to a friend of Conor's mother, Lory Del Santo. After isolating himself for a period, Clapton began working again, writing music for the film Rush (1991). He dealt with the grief of his son's death by cowriting "Tears in Heaven" for the soundtrack with Will Jennings. Jennings said:[Clapton] said to me, "I want to write a song about my boy." Eric had the first verse of the song written, which, to me, is all the song, but he wanted me to write the rest of the verse lines and the release ("Time can bring you down, time can bend your knees..."), even though I told him that it was so personal he should write everything himself. He told me that he had admired the work I did with Steve Winwood and finally there was nothing else but to do as he requested, despite the sensitivity of the subject. This is a song so personal and so sad that it is unique in my experience of writing songs.In an interview in 1992, Clapton said of the song, "It was in the back of my head but it didn't really have a reason for being until I was scoring this movie ... then it sort of had a reason to be. And it is a little ambiguous because it could be taken to be about Conor but it also is meant to be part of the film." In an interview with Daphne Barak, he said: "I almost subconsciously used music for myself as a healing agent, and lo and behold, it worked... I have got a great deal of happiness and a great deal of healing from music."

Release

Shortly after the single was released, Clapton recorded the song in front of an audience at Bray Studios, Berkshire, England as part of a set for MTV Unplugged, released as Unplugged. The album topped numerous charts, including the US, Japan and Australia, reached number two in the UK, and was nominated for nine Grammy Awards the year it was released.

United States and Canada
"Tears in Heaven" is Clapton's best-selling single in the United States. With more than 2,800,000 copies sold – both physical and digital – it remains one of the best-selling pop singles of the 1990s and one of the best-selling singles released by any non-American artist. The Reprise Records single reached number two on the Billboard Hot 100 singles charts, where it charted for 26 weeks. It is Clapton's highest-charting single on the Hot 100 after "I Shot the Sheriff", which is Clapton's only Hot 100 number one single to date. While charting on Americas most important single chart, Clapton received several sales awards by the Billboard magazine, including a "Hot Shot Debut" and a "Power Pick/Sales" certificate. After the physical single release was certified with a Gold disc by the Recording Industry Association of America (RIAA) on March 18, 1992, the single was still selling about 150,000 copies every week. On April 15, 1992, "Tears in Heaven" was certified with a Platinum certification award for sales of more than 1,000,000 copies in the United States. It topped the Top Single Sales chart, compiled by the Billboard magazine in 1992. The release also topped Billboard magazines Adult Contemporary chart, on which "Tears in Heaven" charted for a total of 30 weeks, and also became a number one single on the Top 100 Cashbox charts. By the end of 1992, "Tears in Heaven" sold more than 2,300,000 copies in the United States alone. The pop single also received a lot of airplay, charting 20 weeks on the Top Radio Songs chart, peaking at number three, and reaching position nine on the Mainstream Rock Songs chart, where "Tears in Heaven" stayed for a total of 18 weeks. Also, it was later the fourth-favourite recurrent airplay single, as the Billboard magazine reported in summer of 1992. The 1992 single release was the 6th-best-selling single recording in the United States that year, reaching number six on the Billboard year-end Hot 100 chart as well as the 5th-most successful Adult Contemporary release. It also ranked at number five on the Top Single Sales chart, compiled by the Billboard magazine and reached position 25 on the Top Radio Songs year-end chart in 1992.

In Canada, the Reprise Records single release topped all of the three pop single sales chart in the country and is therefore Clapton's most successful single in Canada to date. The song reached the number one top position on both the Canadian Hot Adult Contemporary Tracks and Top 100 Singles chart, compiled by the RPM magazine. In addition to the already rare success, reaching number one on both of the charts, "Tears in Heaven" was The Record magazine's top retail selling single release. Shortly after the single was released in Canada and topped all of these three record charts, it was certified with a double Platinum sales certification for physical sales exceeding 200,000 copies. In 1992, "Tears in Heaven" was the 17th-best-selling single on RPM magazine's Hot Adult Contemporary Tracks chart.

Europe and Oceania
The pop single release was especially successful in Europe, reaching the Top 10 in 12 countries and the Top 20 in 15 of them. The single charted at number three on the European Hot 100 Singles chart in 1992, and was Europes 21st best-selling single of 1992. In Austria, the physical single peaked at number 25 on the Ö3 Austria Top 40 singles chart, and eventually charted at number ten in week four, reaching its highest charting position in the country. In total, the single of "Tears in Heaven" spent 12 weeks on the nations single sales chart. It was eventually certified with a Gold disc by the International Federation of the Phonographic Industry (IFPI) in Austria and reached number 61 on the country's year-end chart in 1992. In Flanders (Belgium), the single reached three singles charts. In 1992, it peaked at position 44 on Ultratop's Top 50 single chart, and reached its peak position, 16, in week four and five, while on chart for a total of ten weeks. At that time, the single also peaked at number ten on the Belgian VRT Top 30 singles chart, where "Tears in Heaven" spent eight weeks on chart.

In 2010, when a remastered physical edition of the single was released in Belgium, it reached number 16 on the Back Catalogue chart. The song was Belgium's 159th best-selling single in 1992, and certified with a Platinum disc for sales over 50,000 copies by the Belgian Entertainment Association. In Denmark, "Tears in Heaven" topped the single sales chart and was certified Platinum for sales exceeding 10,000 copies by IFPI Denmark, as it spent a total of 29 weeks on chart. In France, the single peaked at number two on the French singles chart, where it charted for 34 weeks. On chart week 28, it was certified with a Platinum award by the Syndicat National de l'Édition Phonographique (SNEP) for sales of more than 500,000 copies in the country. In Germany, the single placed itself on its lowest charting position, number 42. In total, the single charted for eleven weeks on the German singles chart, and sold more than 170,000 both digital and physical copies to date. "Tears in Heaven" topped the single charts in Ireland and was certified with a Platinum disc by the Irish Recorded Music Association (IRMA), selling more than 50,000 copies in 1992, as it reached both of the year-end charts in 1992 and 1993 with positions five and 47. In Italy, the single reached Top five positions as both a physical as well as a digital download single. In 1992, the single peaked at number four on the Italian single chart, compiled by Musica e dischi. Later, the single re-entered the nations single chart as a digital download and streaming single, reaching number five on the charts, now compiled by the Federazione Industria Musicale Italiana (FIMI).

In addition, the digital single was certified with a Platinum disc, for sales and streams exceeding 30,000 units. The single was a medium successful hit in the Netherlands. It reached position 17 on the Dutch Top 40 singles weekly chart, where it stayed for ten weeks, and reached number 131 on the chart's year-end list in 1992. It also reached the Dutch Single Top 100 chart, peaking at number 13 and staying for 21 weeks on chart, before placing itself on position 87 on the year-end Single 100 chart. In Norway, the single topped the VG-lista singles chart in 1992, exactly like it did in Poland, reaching the top spot on the Lista Przebojów Programu Trzeciego (LP3), where it stayed for 16 weeks. In Spain, the single charted at number seven on the nation's singles chart, and was eventually certified with a Gold disc, commemorating the sale of more than 25,000 copies in the country by the Productores de Música de España (PROMUSICAE). In Sweden, "Tears in Heaven" reached number four on the Sverigetopplistan singles chart, where it spent a total of 30 weeks on chart.

In October 1992, it was presented with a Platinum sales award by the Swedish Recording Industry Association (GLF), when it exceeded 50,000 sold units in the country. It reached number 86 on the 1992 Swedish year-end chart. In Switzerland, the single was also a Top ten hit, peaking at number seven on the Schweizer Hitparade, where "Tears in Heaven" stayed for 15 weeks. Here too, the single was presented with a Gold certification by the International Federation of the Phonographic Industry, for sales exceeding 25,000 copies in Switzerland. It was the 38th most-bought single in Switzerland in 1992. "Tears in Heaven" was also a major success for Clapton in his home country, the United Kingdom. The single reached number five on the charts, compiled by the Official Charts Company and spent a total of 14 weeks on the British charts, selling 140,000 copies in the first five weeks. Shortly after, the single was certified with a Gold disc by the British Phonographic Industry (BPI), for sales more than 400,000 copies in the country. With total sales of more than 300,000 copies by the end of 1992, "Tears in Heaven" reached number 56 on Great Britain's 1992 year-end chart.

In Australia, "Tears in Heaven" was a hit record despite charting in the lower positions of the ARIA Singles Chart. In 1992, the pop Reprise Records single placed itself at number 102 on Australia's year-end chart. However, in 1993, it would generate far more single sales, become Australia's 28th best-selling single alongside "Layla". In 1993, the single release was also certified with a Platinum record sales certification by the Australian Recording Industry Association (ARIA) for sales figures exceeding 70,000 physical units. In New Zealand, the single topped the country's single chart for the first five weeks on chart, and spent a total of 18 weeks on the country's single sales chart. On May 31, 1992 – just four weeks on chart in New Zealand – "Tears in Heaven" was certified with a Gold disc by the Recording Industry Association of New Zealand (RIANZ), commemorating the sale of more than 7,500 copies in the country.

Asia and South America
In Asia, "Tears in Heaven" was mostly successful in Japan, where the Reprise Records single stayed for a total of thirty-seven weeks on the nation's Hot 100 single sales chart, compiled by Oricon. Because "Tears in Heaven" was not released as a maxi single or part of a double A-side by Reprise or Warner Bros. Records in Japan, it was not eligible to chart on any other charts. While charting in Japan in 1992, the pop single release was certified with a triple Platinum disc by the Recording Industry Association of Japan (RIAJ), for sales overstepping the 300,000 sales mark. By the end of 1992, "Tears in Heaven" sold more than 389,000 units in Japan, however, not enough for a quadruple Platinum certification award. For the year-end closing of Oricon, it was revealed, the 1992 single release was the fortieth best-selling release on the Hot 100 Singles chart. On the summary of 1992's most-purchased international singles in Japan, "Tears in Heaven" reached number sixty-three. In Taiwan, the Recording Industry of Taiwan (RIT) awarded the single release with a Gold disc, for digital download sales exceeding more than 175,000 units in the country. On Taiwan's year-end chart of 2007, "Tears in Heaven" ranked at position seventy-seven.
The song is also successful in South Korea, singers Kang Susie and Lisa Ha (Ha Soo-bin) once covered the song.

"Tears in Heaven" is Clapton's commercially most successful single release in South America to date, as it reached the single sales charts of three countries. In Argentina, the Reprise Records release topped the country's single charts, compiled by the Cámara Argentina de Productores de Fonogramas y Videogramas (CAPIF). Also, the pop tune topped the singles chart in Brazil, and reached the 1992 year-end charts, placing itself on number fourteen. In Brazil, the single release was certified with a Platinum disc for physical sales of more than 250,000 copies. It is Clapton's highest-selling single in Brazil, as "Change the World" was certified with a Gold disc, and a rare certification for any physical single, as the world's best-selling single "Candle in the Wind 1997" achieved similar sales figures. At last, "Tears in Heaven" peaked at number eight on Asociación Colombiana de Productores de Fonogramas (ASINCOL)'s physical format singles chart in Colombia. It also reached number thirty-eight on the country's year-end chart of 1992, compiled by ASINCOL, and is Clapton's only charting single in the country.

Legacy
Clapton made numerous public service announcements to raise awareness for childproofing windows and staircases. Clapton stopped performing "Tears in Heaven" in 2004, as well as the song "My Father's Eyes", stating: "I didn't feel the loss anymore, which is so much a part of performing those songs. I really have to connect with the feelings that were there when I wrote them. They're kind of gone and I really don't want them to come back, particularly. My life is different now. They probably just need a rest and maybe I'll introduce them for a much more detached point of view."  Eventually, however, both songs would make it back into Clapton's regular setlists, with the latter being performed as recently as 2013, and the former in 2022.

Genesis wrote and recorded the song Since I Lost You for the 1991 We Can't Dance album. Phil Collins, a longtime friend and collaborator of Clapton's, said in interviews the song was inspired by Clapton's loss of Conor.

Dana Key wrote a song in response to "Tears in Heaven" and Clapton's loss of Conor titled Dear Mr. Clapton.  The song appears on Key's 1995 solo album Part of the Mystery.

Awards and nominations

Charts

Weekly charts

Year-end charts

Certifications

Other performances
In January 2005, Ozzy Osbourne and Sharon Osbourne assembled an all-star cast to collaborate on "Tears in Heaven". Sales from the recording benefited the Disasters Emergency Committee's Tsunami Earthquake appeal and the tsunami victims in Southeast Asia. The line up included Gwen Stefani, Mary J. Blige, Pink, Slash, Duff "Rose" McKagan, Steven Tyler, Elton John, Phil Collins, Ringo Starr, Andrea Bocelli, Katie Melua, Josh Groban, Scott Weiland, Paul Santo, Robbie Williams, and Rod Stewart. Ozzy Osbourne and Kelly Osbourne also sang on the song.

See also
List of Hot Adult Contemporary number ones of 1992

Notes

References

1991 songs
1992 singles
1990s ballads
Eric Clapton songs
Grammy Award for Record of the Year
Grammy Award for Song of the Year
Grammy Award for Best Male Pop Vocal Performance
Number-one singles in New Zealand
Oricon International Singles Chart number-one singles
MTV Video Music Award for Best Male Video
Songs about children
Songs written for films
Commemoration songs
British soft rock songs
Songs with lyrics by Will Jennings
RPM Top Singles number-one singles
Song recordings produced by Russ Titelman
Warner Records singles
Songs written by Eric Clapton
Irish Singles Chart number-one singles
Number-one singles in Norway
Rock ballads